John Brian Commins (born 19 February 1965) is a former South African national cricket team member who played in three Test matches during the 1994/95 season. He was the nephew of the late John Commins who played in the Western Province cricket team between 1960 and 1969.

References 

1965 births
Living people
South Africa Test cricketers
South African cricketers
Boland cricketers
Western Province cricketers
Alumni of Rondebosch Boys' High School